Meridarchis oxydelta is a moth in the Carposinidae family. It was described by Alexey Diakonoff in 1967. It is found in the Philippines (Luzon).

References

Natural History Museum Lepidoptera generic names catalog

Carposinidae
Moths described in 1967